Senior Week (also known as Beach Week, Senior Trip, or Grad Week) is a week where recently graduated high school and college seniors in the United States, mainly from the East Coast and the South go to the beach to spend time with their friends. It primarily happens in June, when most of the seniors graduate. The week varies depending on different schools, and school districts, but people still flock for the bulk of the month.

Description
During Senior Week, recently graduated high school and college seniors go to the beach to spend time with their friends. This observance typically occurs during the last half of May and most of June. During Senior Week, the graduates rent condos, beach houses or hotel rooms and enjoy each other's company. Graduates often party and participate in various beachside activities during Senior Week. Some popular Senior Week destinations include Dewey Beach, Delaware; Myrtle Beach, South Carolina; Outer Banks, North Carolina; Ocean City, Maryland; Panama City Beach, Florida; Virginia Beach, Virginia; and Wildwood, New Jersey.

Ocean City, Maryland has several events catered to Senior Week which include Play it Safe, the Ocean City Car Show, & Dew Tour. Graduates are able to ride the bus free during senior week if they are to participate in any of the Ocean City-run Play it Safe events which include volleyball, miniature golf, paintballing, and karaoke.

Myrtle Beach, South Carolina has become one of the most popular locations for recent graduates to visit in May and June. Many students participate in the Myrtlemaniac Card club and entertainment program which includes a series of themed events, a concert, and discounts on transportation, food and other activities.

Controversy
During Senior Week, some of the recently graduated high school students participate in illegal activities such as underage drinking, breaking local curfews, and causing excessive noise. Many beach towns have taken various steps to combat the illegal aspects of Senior Week, such as increasing the number of police officers on patrol to write tickets and arrest people for illegal activities. In Wildwood, New Jersey, a "Rowdy House" ordinance was implemented in 2010 where homeowners would receive a warning if the police are repeatedly called to the house for underage drinking or excessive noise. Following the warning, property owners can receive a fine of up to $1,000 and could lose their mercantile licenses. In Ocean City, Maryland, the Play it Safe program run by the town helps discourage the graduates from participating in illegal activities. In Dewey Beach, Delaware, officers from the police department travel to schools in the spring to remind students that underage drinking will not be tolerated in the town; this action has led to the decline of Dewey Beach as a Senior Week destination.

In popular culture
The film The Graduates is about a group of high school graduates from Maryland who go to Ocean City, Maryland for Senior Week.

See also
Schoolies week
Spring break

References

June observances
Unofficial observances
Student culture in the United States
Types of tourism
Week-long events